Wagino Dachrin Mochtar (9 May 1928 – 13 December 1997) was an Indonesian actor and the husband of Sofia W.D. He starred in Badai-Selatan (1962), Samiun dan Dasima (1971), Sanrego (1971), and Mystics in Bali (1981).

Filmography

References

External links

1928 births
20th-century Indonesian male actors
Indonesian male film actors
People from Pontianak
1997 deaths